Major Cineplex Group Public Co. Ltd. is the largest operator of movie theaters in both Thailand and Laos. Combined with its subsidiary, EGV Entertainment, the company has 490 screens around Thailand. Among its properties is Thailand's largest multiplex, the Paragon Cineplex at Siam Paragon, with 16 screens and 5,000 seats, along with the IMAX theater. The second-largest chain in Thailand is SF Cinema City.

History

Major Cineplex was founded by Vicha Poolvaraluk (or Poolvaraluck) in 1994. A member of a family with roots in the movie business (the family was involved in film studios as well as several single-screen theaters), Vicha started out in property development.

In 1992, he was asked by his father, Charoen Poolvaraluck, to take over the movie theater business. Vicha decided on a concept of large movie complexes that could offer a range of entertainment services, including not only movies, but also bowling alleys, karaoke rooms, restaurants and shopping. The first such complex opened in 1996 on Nakhon Chaisri Road in Pinklao, Bangkok. The 14-screen, 4,000-seat Major Cineplex Ratchayothin opened in 1998 and featured Thailand's first IMAX cinema. It was the company's flagship cinema complex until 2006, when Paragon Cineplex opened. Other early Major Cineplex theaters include branches at Ramkamheang and Sukhumvit.

In 2004, Major Cineplex absorbed Thailand's No 2 theater operator, EGV Entertainment, which was Thailand's first cineplex operator. EGV had been owned by a rival branch of the Poolvaraluck family, headed by Vicha Poolvaraluck's cousin, Wichai Poolvaraluck, who started EGV as a partnership with Golden Village.

Theaters

Major Cineplex

There are at least 19 Major Cineplex-branded theaters in Thailand, with the number expected to grow in the coming years. The company aims to increase its total number of screens to 500 (including EGV cinemas) by 2012. Major Cineplex's theaters range from shopping complexes, anchored by the cineplex, such as Major Cineplex Ratchayothin or Major Cineplex Sukhumvit, that include bowling alleys, fitness centers, restaurants and shops, to multiplexes that are part of larger shopping malls, such as the Bang Na or Rama III branches in Bangkok.

At the theaters themselves, there is a range of seating choices, including the luxury "Emperor" class, which is similar to EGV's "Gold Class" (see below), and "Opera", which provides a sofa-like seat, designed for couples.

In December 2006, the company debuted another flagship brand, the Esplanade Cineplex, consisting of 13 theaters and a 26-lane bowling alley at the Esplanade complex on Ratchadaphisek Road in Bangkok's Din Daeng district.

Major Cinema

Thailand's first cineplex operator, EGV, or Entertain Golden Village, was formed in 1993 by Wichai Poolworaluk's Entertainment Theatres Network as a joint venture with Hong Kong's Golden Harvest and Australia's Village Roadshow (which formed Golden Village).

The first cineplex was opened in 1994 at Future Park Bang Khae. Other branches include the Grand EGV in Siam Discovery Center (opposite Siam Square) and the EGV Metropolis, which anchors a BigC shopping center on Rajadamri Road in Pathum Wan district, Bangkok, opposite Central World Plaza.

Village Roadshow took over Golden Harvest's stake in 2000, and in 2002, Wichai bought out Village Roadshow's 50% interest. The company then merged with Major Cineplex in 2004, putting aside a rivalry within the Poolvaraluck family.

EGV's theaters
Aside from its EGV-branded multiplexes, EGV has the following:
Gold Class – Smaller theaters, located on existing EGV properties, with their own box offices. The screening rooms have around 50 seats, with heavily padded reclining chairs and valet food-and-drink service. Blankets, pillows and foot-warming stockings are provided. EGV was the pioneer in this concept of luxury movie-going in Thailand and it remains popular.
D-Cine – Small, living-room-like theaters where customers can program their own DVD movie showings.
Drive-In Café – A short-lived concept, this was tried in 2004 in an auditorium at EGV Seacon in Prawet district. Featuring a 1950s American drive-in theater motif, the audience sat in automobile-like restaurant booths and could be served hot dogs and hamburgers while they watched a movie.

Paragon Cineplex

Opened in early 2006, Paragon Cineplex is on the fifth floor of the Siam Paragon shopping mall. With 16 screens and 5,000 seats, it is Thailand's largest movie theater. It includes the 1,200-seat Siam Pavalai Royal Grand Theatre by Bangkok Dusit Medical Services as well as some smaller Bangkok Airways Blue Ribbon Screens with reclining seats. There is also the Enigma, a members-only cinema.

IMAX
Thailand's second IMAX cinema is part of the Paragon Cineplex at Siam Paragon. It was firstly located at the Major Cineplex Ratchayothin.

In 2020 Major Cineplex Group has a 6 IMAX Theatre around Thailand including, Paragon Cineplex at Siam Paragon, ICON Cineconic at Iconsiam, Major Cineplex CentralFestival Chiangmai, Major Cineplex Ratchayothin, Quartier CineArt The EmQuartier Bangkok, and Westgate Cineplex CentralPlaza WestGate.

In 2022, Major Cineplex struck a deal for new three IMAX Laser installations at Paragon Cineplex, ICON Cineconic ,and Mega Cineplex at Mega Bangna (New branch).

Major Cineplex also operate IMAX Theater in Cambodia, it is a part of the Major Cineplex by SMART at AEON Mall Sen Sok.

Esplanade Cineplex

Opened in late 2006, Esplanade Cineplex is a forth installment of Major Cineplex specialty chain. It's located on the fifth floor of Esplanade Ratchada shopping mall in Dindeang district. With 12 screens, including 2 Cinema Galleries for showing the Experimental film, BSC Diamond Screens with reclining seats, and Dolby Atmos cinema.

However, Major Cineplex has opened a second branch of Esplanade in Nonthaburi Province, and serve Thailand's biggest and largest digital cinema theater "MMAX THEATRE". And provide a same functional of Esplanade Ratchada except Dolby Atmos and RealD cinema system.

Quartier CineArt
The eighth installment of Major Cineplex chain, exclusively built in The EmQuartier Bangkok shopping mall. It is said to be a Thailand first CineArt concept. With 8 screen, including IMAX, Thailand first Laser Projector "AEON THEATRE @ QUARTIER", Thailand and Asean first Screen X theatre, Dolby Atmos and RealD XL theatre, and 4 digital cinemas.

ICON Cineconic
The seventeenth installment of Major Cineplex chain, exclusively built in Iconsiam Bangkok shopping mall in 2018. It is said to be a Thailand first interracial standard concept and Thailand first laserplex. With 14 screens and 3,000 seats, ICON Cineconic cinemas are including The Iconic IMAX Theater, The Iconic VIP Screen "Thai Airways Smooth as Silk Premier Screen"-the 6 star theater, Cineconic Kids Cinema, Cineconic Living Cinema-a cinema-themed with living room concept, the 4DX theater, and 9 digital cinemas that equipped with laser projection system.

The "M" Cinema Collection 
In 2016, Major Cineplex has launched the "M" cinema collection to regrouping the Major Cineplex specialty chain into one cinema group and refers to new boutique cinema concept. It's including all brand of Major Groups cinema except Paragon Cineplex, Esplanade Cineplex, Quartier CineArt, and Icon Cineconic.

The "M" cinema collection has an eleventh specialty cinema around Thailand. The chain brand's include:

 Paradise Cineplex - Located in Paradise Park shopping mall. Designed in Movie Oasis theme.
 MEGA Cineplex - Located in Mega City Bangna shopping mall. Designed in Digital theme. This brand including 4DX theatre, and the third IMAX Laser theatre in Thailand.
 Hatyai Cineplex - Located in Central Hatyai shopping mall in Songkla. Designed in Crystal theme that related to shopping mall theme. This brand including second upcountry 4DX theatre location.
 WestGate Cineplex - Located in Central Westgate shopping mall. Designed in Digital Edge theme. This brand including IMAX theatre, 4DX theatre, and introducing KIDS cinema a cinema hall for kids.
 Promenade Cineplex - Located in The Promenade shopping mall. Designed in Classical theme. This brand including 4DX theatre.
 Eastville Cineplex - Located in Central Eastville shopping mall. Designed in English Garden cinema concept and provide the first eco-cineplex that belong to "Green Ville" concepts of shopping mall. This brand including 4DX theatre.
 Diana Cineplex - Located in Diana Hat Yai shopping mall in Songkla. Designed in Movie Relaxation theme.
 Ayutthaya City Park Cineplex - Located in Ayutthaya City Park shopping mall in Phra Nakhon Si Ayutthaya. Designed in Movie Relaxation theme.
 Korat Cineplex - Located in The Mall Korat shopping mall in Nakhon Ratchasima. Designed in Digital Edge theme belong to WestGate Cineplex.
 Blúport Cineplex - Located in Blúport shopping mall in Huahin, Prachuap Khiri Khan. Designed in Resort theme belong to shopping mall theme.
 Seacon Cineplex - Located in Season Square Srinagarinda shopping mall. Designed in Resort theme.
 Si Racha Cineplex - Located in Central Si Racha shopping mall in Si Racha, Chonburi. Designed in Digital Oasis theme.
 Chanthaburi Cineplex - Located in Central Chanthaburi shopping mall in Chanthaburi. Designed in Digital Oasis theme.

Other businesses
While movie theaters are Major Cineplex Group's core business, the company is heavily involved in the bowling alley business, with a total of 360 lanes under its Major Bowl Hit brand. It also has 222 karaoke rooms.

Major's property development arm leases retail space to outside tenants in its anchored shopping malls. Major Cineplex also has a 25% stake in Siam Future Development Plc (SET: SF), a developer of shopping malls.

The company has also invested in the growing California WOW Xperience Plc (SET: CAWOW), the leading fitness center operator in Thailand. It has 10 branches: eight in Bangkok, and one each in Pattaya and Chiang Mai. It branched off due to foreign ownership rules for the wholly owned Asian subsidiary of 24 Hour Fitness, called California Fitness, and has member swap agreements with both chains. It holds a 36.75% stake in that venture, and consequently, California's Fitness Center branches are becoming part of Major Cineplex's developments.

In 2007, Major Cineplex's ticketing service, Major Ticketing, which sold advance bookings for movies, as well as other events, merged with BEC-TERO's Thaiticketmaster. The merged entity is called Thaiticketmajor.

References

External links
 Major Cineplex corporate website
 EGV website
 Paragon Cineplex
 IMAX Thailand
 Financial Statement Quarter 1/2006 (ZIP) at the Stock Exchange of Thailand

Cinema chains in Thailand
Companies based in Bangkok
Mass media companies established in 1996
Companies listed on the Stock Exchange of Thailand
1996 establishments in Thailand
Thai brands